Interstate 410 (abbreviated I-410, and colloquially called Loop 410) is a loop route of I-10 around San Antonio, Texas. It is identified as Connally Loop in honor of former Texas Governor John Connally.

Route description 

I-410 circumnavigates the city of San Antonio, officially beginning and ending at the junction with I-35 on the southwest side of the loop. There are vast differences between the northern arc and southern arc of the loop. The northern arc serves the heavily urbanized portions of San Antonio and is currently being upgraded to as many as five lanes in each direction. The southern arc resembles more of a rural interstate as it transverses, for the most part, undeveloped portions of San Antonio as a four-lane interstate. I-410 intersects I-10 twice, I-35 twice, I-37 once, as well as US Route 90 (US 90), US 281, and Texas State Highway 151 (SH 151), all freeways in the San Antonio metro area with the exception of Loop 1604, which forms a secondary loop around the city, and PA 1502 (Wurzbach Parkway), which is located about  outside the loop on the north side. I-410 serves San Antonio International Airport, Lackland AFB, Fort Sam Houston, South Texas Medical Center, Southwest Research Institute, and Toyota Motor Manufacturing Texas.

History 

Like most cities in Texas, San Antonio was served by a loop around the city long before the arrival of the Interstate Highway System. Loop 13, although not a freeway, served in this role up until the 1950s, when many of San Antonio's freeways were constructed. The northern half of Loop 13 followed the current path of I-410 while the southern half still exists on the south side of San Antonio. Much of the freeway was proposed during the mid-1950s with construction beginning on the northwest portion of the loop near I-10. On October 15, 1960, Loop 13 from I-10 to I-35 was redesignated as Loop 410 for continuity purposes. By 1961, the freeway had been completed from I-35 on the southwest side to just east of US 281 near the airport, where it continued once to the east as a four-lane highway to I-35. By 1964, the southern arc had been extended eastward from I-35 to Roosevelt Avenue and was under construction from Roosevelt to I-35 on the east side of the city. By 1967, the eastern arc had been completed to Interstate Highway standards, and the remaining portion from US 281 to I-35 on the city's north side had been completely upgraded to Interstate Highway standards, but still carried the State Loop 410 designation until July 31, 1969, when it officially became I-410.

Due to the city growing primarily to the north, I-410 required upgrading along this stretch. It was expanded to six lanes in the late 1970s and early 1980s from Ingram Road to I-35 North. It was further expanded to six lanes from Ingram to Valley Hi Road in 1987. An additional westbound lane was added from I-10 West to Babcock Road in 1996.

I-410 was widened from the late 1990s through early 2010s along its entire northern arc from Culebra Road to Austin Highway, with five lanes each way and interchange upgrades at I-10 and San Pedro, and an entire new interchange at US 281., officially called the "San Antonio Web".

Exit list 
Exit numbers correspond to mileage from the south junction with I-35.

References

410
10-4
4
10-4
410
Transportation in Bexar County, Texas